Notocacteae is a tribe of cacti belonging to the subfamily Cactoideae. It is one of the oldest cactus lineages endemic to South America.

Genera

References 

 
Caryophyllales tribes